The U.S. state of South Carolina is located in the Southern United States. It is the 23rd largest state by population, with a population of 5,024,369 according to 2017 United States Census estimates.

Demographics

According to the United States Census Bureau, as of 2017, South Carolina had an estimated population of 5,024,369, which is an increase of 64,547 from the prior year and an increase of 399,005, or 8.6%, since the year 2010. Immigration from outside the United States resulted in a net increase of 36,401 people, and migration within the country produced a net increase of 115,084 people.

According to the University of South Carolina's Arnold School of Public Health, Consortium for Latino Immigration Studies, South Carolina's foreign-born population grew faster than any other state between 2000 and 2005. The Consortium reports that the number of Hispanics in South Carolina is greatly undercounted by census enumerators and may be more than 400,000.

South Carolina’s population increased by 15.4 percent between 1990 and 2000 and by another 7.4 percent between
2000 and 2005; 11.6 percent of that increase has been attributed to immigration, primarily from Mexico and Latin America. Most work in the construction industry, with another proportion in agriculture, in addition to processing factories. The Latino population has increased considerably faster in South Carolina and the Southeast than for the United States as a whole.

The five largest ancestry groups in South Carolina identified by respondents to the US census are African American (29.5%), American (13.9%), English (8.4%), German (8.4%), and Irish (7.9%) (thus a total of more than 39% from northern Europe).

From 1720 until 1920, African slaves and their descendants made up a majority of the state's population. (See census data below.) Whites became a majority in the state after that date, following the migration of tens of thousands of blacks to northern industrial cities in the Great Migration. In the 21st century, most of the African-American population in the state lives in the Lowcountry and the Midlands areas, historically areas of their greatest concentrations of population.

6.6% of South Carolina's total population were reported as under 5 years old, 25.2% under 18, and 12.1% were 65 or older. Females made up approximately 51.4% of the population in 2000. Those who self-identify as having American ancestry are of mostly British Isles ancestry: English and Scots-Irish stock.

Birth data
Note: Births in table do not add up, because Hispanics are counted both by their ethnicity and by their race, giving a higher overall number.

Since 2016, data for births of White Hispanic origin are not collected, but included in one Hispanic group; persons of Hispanic origin may be of any race.
 NH = Non-hispanic

Center of population

Most populous counties

Cities and towns

Largest municipalities
Population estimates as of 2010.
 
 Columbia – 129,272
 Charleston – 120,083
 North Charleston – 97,471
 Mount Pleasant – 67,843
 Rock Hill – 66,154
 Greenville – 58,409
 Summerville – 43,392
 Sumter- 40,524
 Hilton Head Island – 37,099
 Florence – 37,056
 Spartanburg – 37,013
 Goose Creek – 35,938
 Aiken – 29,524
 Myrtle Beach – 27,109
 Anderson – 26,686
 Greer – 25,515
 Greenwood – 23,222
 Mauldin – 22,889
 North Augusta – 21,348
 Easley – 19,993

City and MSAs
South Carolina's metropolitan statistical areas (MSAs) are much larger than their central city population counts suggest. South Carolina law makes it difficult for municipalities to annex unincorporated areas, so city proper populations look smaller than is reflected in the total metropolitan populations.

For example, Myrtle Beach has a municipal population of less than 50,000 persons, but its MSA has more than 200,000 persons. Anderson's municipal population is smaller than Sumter's, but the Anderson MSA is larger, as seen below.

Columbia, Charleston, and Greenville all have urbanized area populations between 400,000–550,000, while their metropolitan statistical area (MSA) populations are each more than 600,000. The Greenville-Spartanburg-Anderson MSA population consists of approximately 1.4 million people, making it the largest in the state and third largest in the Carolinas.

Urban Area Population
As of 2010:
 
Columbia – 549,777
Charleston/North Charleston - 548,404
Greenville – 400,492
Myrtle Beach – 215,304
Spartanburg – 180,786
Mauldin/Simpsonville - 120,577
Rock Hill – 104,996
Florence – 89,557
Anderson – 75,702
Sumter – 73,107
Hilton Head Island - 68,998

Religion

South Carolina residents are majority Protestant Christian, with a lower percentage of people claiming no religious affiliation than the national average. The religious affiliations of the people of South Carolina are as follows:
 Christian: 78% 
 Protestant: 65%
 Evangelical (e.g., Southern Baptist Convention): 35%
 Mainline Protestant (e.g., United Methodist Church): 15%
 Historically Black (e.g., African Methodist Episcopal Church): 15%
 Roman Catholic: 10%
 Other Christian: 3%
 Other Religions: 3%
 Non-Religious: 19%

Sephardic Jews have lived in the state for more than 300 years, especially in and around Charleston. Many came from London, where they were merchants. Until about 1830, South Carolina had the largest population of Jews in North America, most in Charleston. Some have married and assimilated into Christian society; in the 21st century, less than 1% of the total religiously affiliated people are Jewish. The proportion of Roman Catholics in the state has been increasing given migrants from the North and immigration from Latin America.

Historical demographics
Beginning in 1790, the United States Census Bureau collected the population statistics of South Carolina. The years listed prior to that are estimates and exclude the Native American population. From 1790 until 1860, the designated demographic classifications were  white,  black slave and  free black.

Following the Civil War, the racial groupings were  white,  black and  other. 

The following is a list of census data for the state of South Carolina:

References

External links
U.S. Census website – 2010 Census data
2000 South Carolina Census Data

 
Geography of South Carolina
South Carolina